John Houston  (1891 – 20 June 1962) was a New Zealand historian and writer who specialised in the history of Taranaki Māori, and of the Taranaki land wars.  He spent 30 years studying and recording Māori history and lore, the result of which was the posthumously published Maori Life in Old Taranaki (1965).  Other works included Turi of the Aotea canoe (1933) and the Encyclopedia of New Zealand biography of Kimball Bent (1966).

In the 1961 Queen's Birthday Honours, Houston was appointed an Officer of the Order of the British Empire, for services to the community in Taranaki.

References

Te Ao Hou: A Book on Taranaki History: Maori Life in Old Taranaki, March 1966
Te Runanga o Ngati Ruanui: Te Pou Korero: Registration Update, August 2003
Encyclopedia of New Zealand: Bent, Kimble, 1966

20th-century New Zealand historians
People from Taranaki
1891 births
1962 deaths
New Zealand Officers of the Order of the British Empire